Edmund Wood may refer to:

Edmund Burke Wood (1820–1882), Canadian politician
Edmund Wood (footballer) (1903–1986), English footballer
Edmund Wood (British politician), British Member of Parliament, 1924–1929